The 1969 Bathurst 100 was a motor race staged at the Mount Panorama Circuit near Bathurst in New South Wales, Australia on 7 April 1969. The race was contested over 26 laps at a total distance of approximately 100 miles and it was Round 2 of the 1969 Australian Drivers' Championship.

The race was won by Jack Brabham driving a Brabham BT31B Repco.

Results

References

Bathurst 100
Motorsport in Bathurst, New South Wales